Ian S. Macowat (born 19 November 1965 in Liverpool) is an English former professional footballer who played in the Football League as a defender.

Honours
with Crewe Alexandra
Football League Fourth Division third-place promotion winner: 1988–89

References

Sources

1965 births
Living people
Footballers from Liverpool
English footballers
Association football defenders
Everton F.C. players
Gillingham F.C. players
Crewe Alexandra F.C. players
Northwich Victoria F.C. players
Atherton Laburnum Rovers F.C. players
English Football League players
National League (English football) players